Ichtershausen is a village and a former municipality in the district Ilm-Kreis, in Thuringia, Germany. Since 31 December 2012, it is part of the municipality Amt Wachsenburg.

References

Former municipalities in Thuringia
Saxe-Coburg and Gotha